Peace and Blessings is an album by the American jazz saxophonist Kalaparusha Maurice McIntyre recorded in 1979 for the Italian Black Saint label.

Reception
The Allmusic review by Scott Yanow awarded the album 4 stars stating "the emphasis is on intense solos and very free improvising. There is plenty of fire displayed on this spirited set".

Track listing
All compositions by Kalaparusha Maurice McIntyre except as indicated
 "J & M" - 9:25 
 "African Procesion" - 1:10 
 "Any Way You Want It" (Longineu Parsons) - 9:34 
 "N 39" - 7:22 
 "Not This" - 5:38 
 "Hexagon" - 7:40 
Recorded at Barigozzi Studio in Milano, Italy, on June 18, 1979

Personnel
Kalaparusha Maurice McIntyre - tenor saxophone, flute, clarinet, bass clarinet, shenai, bells, tambourine, monkey-drum
Longineu Parsons - trumpet, flugelhorn, flute, sopranino saxophone, soprano saxophone, alto saxophone, recorder
Leonard Jones - double bass
King L. Mock - drums

References

Black Saint/Soul Note albums
1979 albums
Kalaparusha Maurice McIntyre albums